Pierre Yves Clouin is a video artist and filmmaker. He was born in Paris, where he lives and works. He studied architecture at the École Nationale Supérieure des Beaux-Arts in Paris. He has exhibited his paintings and photos in Paris.

Awards & distinctions

2010 
 Winner Institut français Hors les Murs program  Residency Nouvelles Images, Montréal, Québec, Canada

2007 
 Best of Independent Exposure, San Francisco, CA, USA: Le saut dans le vide (The Leap Into the Void)

2002 
 Certificate of Merit, Chicago International Film Festival, Experimental Shorts Competition, Chicago, Illinois, USA: We Cannot Exhibit It 
 Best Musical and Audience Choice Awards, Thaw, Festival of Film Video and Digital Media, Institute for Cinema and Culture, Iowa City, Iowa, USA: Strong Enough 
 Highlight Selection, Cinematexas, Austin, Texas, USA: Cul en l'air (My Levitating Butt)

2000 
 Audience Award, Best New Media, Festival du Cinema Francophone en Acadie, Moncton, New Brunswick, Canada: Broom Ballet

1999 
 Special Mention, Videoarcheology, Paris, France / Sofia, Bulgaria: Head Egg 
 Silver Spire Award, San Francisco International Film Festival, Golden Gate Award Competition, New Visions Video, San Francisco, USA: Workman

1998 
 Third Prize Experimental, NAP Video Festival, New Arts Program, Lehigh Valley & Berks, Pennsylvania, USA: Front Room

1997 
 Prix DRAC Auvergne (French Ministry of Culture), Vidéoformes, Clermont-Ferrand, France: C'est le veau qui bêle (The Bleating Calf)

1996 
 Highlight Selection, Videonale 7, Bonn, Germany: C'est le veau qui bêle (The Bleating Calf)

References

Further reading
The Oxford Handbook of Screendance Studies, edited by Douglas Rosenberg

External links
Official site

Living people
Film directors from Paris
French experimental filmmakers
Year of birth missing (living people)